Skatebård is the pseudonym of the Norwegian DJ and producer Bård Aasen Lødemel. Skatebård was born in 1976 in Harstad, grew up in Hovdebygda, but has since relocated to Bergen. Skatebård is well known for being a part of the hip-hop act Side Brok formed together with Sjef R and Thorstein Hyl III, but he is also a notable electronic artist who generally fits into the Italo disco genre. Skatebård is the founder of the record label Digitalo Enterprises.

Selected Discography
(2015) Skatebård - CDIII (Balsa Wood)
(2011) Skatebård - Vill Stil (Digitalo Enterprises)
(2010) Skatebård - The Starwatcher EP (Luna Flicks)
(2008) Skatebård - Cosmos (Digitalo Enterprises)
(2007) Skatebård - Love Attack EP (Digitalo Enterprises)
(2007) Skatebård - Marimba/Pagans (Supersoul Recordings)
(2007) Skatebård - Vuelo EP (Radius Belgium)
(2006) Skatebård - June Nights South of Siena (Sex Tags Mania)
(2006) Skatebård - Midnight Magic (Digitalo Enterprises)
(2006) Skatebård - Flashes in the Night (Digitalo Enterprises)
(2005) Skatebård - Conga (Sex Tags Mania)
(2003) Skatebård - Future (Keys of Life Finland)
(2002) Skatebård - Skateboarding was a crime (in 1989) (Tellè Records/Tellektro)

Remixography
(2012) Omar V & Robin C - "Complete (Skatebård Remix)" - [12" Full Pupp]
 (2008) Annie - "Two Of Hearts (Skatebård's High Energy In The Night Remix)" [CD Universal-Island Records]
(2008) Sally Shapiro - "He Keeps Me Alive (Skatebård Remix)" [CD Paper Bag Records]
(2007) Datarock - "Fa Fa Fa (Skatebård Remix)" [12" Network (record label)]
(2007) Frost - "One Hundred Years (Skatebård Remix)" [CD Frostworld Recordings]
(2007) The Wörk - "Just Talk (Skatebård Remix)"
 Au Revoir Simone - "Fallen Snow (Skatebård Remix)"
 Simian Mobile Disco - "Hustler (Skatebård Remix)"

External links
Skatebård on Myspace
Fan Page on Facebook
Skatebård Profile on Last.fm
Skatebård - June Nights South of Siena, live recording from Ekkofest in Bergen 2007
Side Brok home page
Skatebård on Discogs

1976 births
Living people
Norwegian DJs
Electronic dance music DJs
Musicians from Harstad